Birak-e Sofla (also Romanized as Bīrak-e Soflá; also known as Bīraq-e Soflá, Bīraq-e Pā’īn, and Bīrak-e Pā’īn) is a village in Sangar Rural District, in the Central District of Faruj County, North Khorasan Province, Iran. At the 2006 census, its population was 467, in 106 families.

References 

Populated places in Faruj County